Anketa Maharana (born 12 January 1996), credited as Apsara Rani, is an Indian actress who predominantly appears in Telugu films.

Early life 
Anketa was born on 12 January 1996 in Dehradun, Uttaranchal, into Odia-speaking Hindu family. She was interested in acting and modeling since childhood. Anketa decided to become an actress at a very early age. She completed her schooling from a local private school. Later, she completed her Engineering from GIT College in Belgaum. After completing her higher education, she stepped into the entertainment world
. Currently, she works as a model and actress in the Tollywood film industry.

Career 
Anketa made her acting debut with R. Raghuraj's romantic drama 4 Letters. She featured alongside an ensemble cast including Eswar, Tuya Chakraborty, Posani Krishna Murali, Kausalya and Vidyullekha Raman. She played one of the two female lead roles, Anupama, a sexy fashion designing student. The critics singled out her vivacious performance and praised her screen presence and also said "Apsara catches you completely unaware" and has the "combination of looks and talent". The film emerged as a commercial success.

Her next film role was in the Satya Prakash directed romantic horror Oollalla Oollalla in 2020. Along with Nataraj and Noorin Shereef. The film was released on 1 January 2020 and received negative reviews upon its release and was declared a flop at the box office. The following year, she appeared opposite newcomer Rock Kacchi in Thriller, a romantic thriller from the director Ram Gopal Varma. It was on Ram Gopal Varma's insistence that Anketa changed her name to Apsara Rani. Due to the COVID-19 pandemic, the film was released on Shreyas ET App on 14 August 2020, and received positive reviews from the audience and critics.

In 2021, Apsara returned to Telugu Cinema with a special appearance in Gopichand Malineni's thriller mystery Krack starring Ravi Teja, Shruti Haasan, Varalaxmi Sarathkumar and Samuthirakani. She appeared as an item girl in the song "Bhoom Bhaddhal".

Apsara has also appeared as an item girl in the song "Pepsi Aunty" from the film Seetimaarr.

Upcoming projects 
The next cast was in the Ram Gopal Varma's Dangerous India's first lesbian crime action film along with Naina Ganguly. She has also committed to essay the female lead opposite bilingual film Patnagarh, made in Odia and Telugu languages, based on the Patnagarh bombing. Additionally, Apsara is reuniting with Ram Gopal Varma's D Company as an item girl in film.

Filmography

References

External links 
 
 
 
 About Apsara Rani film Thriller

Living people
21st-century Indian actresses
Actresses in Telugu cinema
1996 births
Indian film actresses
Actresses from Dehradun
Odia people